Faltu (translation: "Useless") is a Bengali movie based on Syed Mustafa Siraj's story Ranir Ghater Brittanto. It was released in 2006. It won the 2007 National Award. Produced by Arindam Chaudhuri (Planman Motion Pictures) and directed by  Anjan Das, the movie featured Soumitra Chatterjee, Indrani Halder, Yash Pandit, Pradip Mukherjee and Manjari Fadnis, Nirmal Kumar, Masood Akhtar, and Biplab Chatterjee. It had been selected from India for the Spain film festival in the competitive category.

Plot
The story is set around Ranirghat of Murshidabad District in West Bengal in the early 1950s. It is the story of a 20-year-old orphan called Faltu (faltu in Bengali means worthless, junk) and his search for the man who has fathered him. This is also the account of a village and its people, woven around a narrative with myriad moments and a lot of dramatic events.

Ranirghat is a village made up of refugees from the then East Pakistan. (Its current population is 148.) The lives of the villagers take a new turn when a census official questions Faltu's parentage. While it is well known that Faltu is the son of Sureswari Dasi aka Suri Khepi (a mad woman on the street played Indrani Haldar), no one knows who his father is. Neither does Faltu nor he has even bothered with the question. He was happy with what he was doing — driving a bus and ferrying villagers.

The census official's question opens a Pandora's box. It turns out that many apparently upright men in the village — including Ismail (Biplab Chatterjee), who brought up Faltu and taught him driving — raped Suri Khepi, taking advantage of her mental condition. Everybody knows that Faltu's father is one of them, but nobody is sure of who that is. Faltu is not particularly concerned. He is more interested in earning his living, and pursuing his love interest — Tuktuki (Manjari Fadnis).

A government order brings in bad news for the villagers of Ranirghat. As part of "development" plans, the government wants to construct a bridge from the village across the river and villagers have to vacate. They agree to do so but, before parting ways, they want Faltu and Tuktuki to marry to make up for what they had done to Suri Khepi. A guilty feeling haunts all the rapists.

The elders of the village call a meeting to organize the marriage. When they propose the marriage to Tuktuki's father, he flatly disagrees in a weird manner. He goes to Faltu and discloses that he also had raped Suri Khepi: The marriage should not occur as Faltu and Tuktuki are stepbrother and sister. Tuktuki overheard this. She commits suicide, and the next morning she is found hanging from a tree. The villagers of Ranirghat left with pain-stricken hearts, while the background narrator declares that "with a proud and wounded heart, and several questions in mind, the undefeated Faltu drives on."

As the construction work of the bridge goes on, the last bit of film captures a night sequence at the construction site: an engineer, sensing the presence of any unknown one, turns on his torch on the person. The last scene freezes there, showing another mad woman trying to drink water from the streamlets pouring down from the upper iron structure. Like the case of Suri Khepi, perhaps this was the beginning of another story of committing sins.

The entire story deals with human relations and how the guilt of having done something wrong haunts everyone in the village. They want to make up for their sins, but end up opening a new can of worms and spoiling a marriage.

Cast
Yash Pandit as Faltu
Manjari Fadnis as Tuktuki
Soumitra Chatterjee as Potter
Indrani Haldar as Suri Khepi 
Nirmal Kumar as Priest
Sumanta Mukherjee
Debesh Roy Chowdhury
Masood Akhtar
Pradip Mukherjee

Crew
 Producer(s): Arindam Chaudhuri Planman Motion Pictures
 Director: 
Story:Syed Mustafa Siraj
Production Design:
Dialogue:
Lyrics:
Editing: Sanjeeb Dutta
Cinematography: Shirsha Roy
Art: Samir Chanda
Sound: Anup Mukherjee

Critical reception

 A rich audio-visual experience — The Telegraph of Kolkata (8 stars out of 10)
 Anjan Das has meticulously crafted each scene in the film... You just can't stop praising it! — Bartaman
Srabanti Chakrabarti of Rediff argued that the story was good but the performances of the main actors weakened the film.
A moving saga with cutting edge depiction — The Hindu
 The film scores on the storyline and direction — The Pioneer

Awards
BFJA Awards (2007)
Best Actress in a Supporting Role: Indrani Haldar
Best Director: Anjan Das
Best Screenplay: Anjan Das
54th National Film Awards-Best Film on Family Welfare Best

See also
 Jara Bristite Bhijechhilo

References

External links

 www.gomolo.in profile
www.telegraphindia.com
faltu.indiatimes.com 
www.rediff.com

2006 films
Bengali-language Indian films
Films based on short fiction
Best Film on Family Welfare National Film Award winners
2000s Bengali-language films